Eurysticta kununurra is a species of damselfly in the family Isostictidae,
commonly known as a Kimberley pin. 
It has been recorded in the Kimberley region in Western Australia, where it inhabits rivers.

Eurysticta kununurra is a small to medium-sized damselfly, pale brown in colour with a pair of bronze-green bands on its back behind its head.

Gallery

See also
 List of Odonata species of Australia

References 

Isostictidae
Odonata of Australia
Insects of Australia
Endemic fauna of Australia
Taxa named by J.A.L. (Tony) Watson
Insects described in 1991
Damselflies